Rezaul Alam Khandaker is a Bangladesh Nationalist Party politician and the former Member of Parliament of Rangpur-18.

Career
Khandaker was elected to parliament from Rangpur-18 as a Bangladesh Nationalist Party candidate in 1979.

References

Bangladesh Nationalist Party politicians
Living people
2nd Jatiya Sangsad members
Year of birth missing (living people)